Adisa Ajahni-Onifade De Rosario (born October 27, 2004) is a soccer player who plays as a goalkeeper for Toronto FC II in MLS Next Pro. Born in the United States, he has been called up to Canada at youth international level.

Early life
De Rosario was born in San Jose, California, while his father Dwayne De Rosario played for the San Jose Earthquakes. He played youth soccer with the Toronto FC Academy.

Club career
He played with Toronto FC III in the League1 Ontario Summer Championship in 2021.

In 2022, he began the season with Toronto FC II in MLS Next Pro on an Academy contract. He made his unofficial debut in a friendly on August 3 against Sunderland U23. In August 2022, he signed a short-term developmental contract with HFX Wanderers FC of the Canadian Premier League. He was then briefly recalled by Toronto FC II to re-join the team. However, shortly after he returned to the Wanderers after an injury to goalkeeper Kieran Baskett and on October 9 he made his professional debut against Forge FC.

International career
In April 2022, Adisa De Rosario was named to a camp for the Canada U20 for the first time.

Personal life
He is the son of former Canada national team player Dwayne De Rosario and the younger brother of fellow professional soccer player Osaze De Rosario.

References

External links

2004 births
Living people
Canadian soccer players
American soccer players
Canadian sportspeople of Guyanese descent
American people of Canadian descent
American people of Guyanese descent
Citizens of Canada through descent
Association football goalkeepers
Toronto FC players
Toronto FC II players
HFX Wanderers FC players
Canadian Premier League players